Uncial 0314 (in the Gregory-Aland numbering), is a Greek uncial manuscript of the New Testament. Palaeographically it has been assigned to the 6th-century. The manuscript has survived in very fragmentary condition.

Description 

The codex contains a small text of the Gospel of John 5:43, on one fragment of the parchment leaf. The original size of the leaf is unknown the survived fragment has only 10 by 2 cm. The fragment contains only 33 letters.

Currently it is dated by the INTF to the 6th century.

The text is written in one column per page, original number of lines is unknown, the survived fragment has only two lines. The writing is visible on one side only. This fragment was identified by D. Jongkind. The writing is very thick and rounded.

It has error of itacism (ε → αι).

 Text
ΤΙ ΤΩ ΟΝΟΜΑΤΙ ΤΩ ΙΔΙΩ ΕΚΕΙΝΟΝ ΛΗΜΨΕΣΘΑΙ

 Location
It is currently housed at the Christopher De Hamel Collection (Gk. Ms 4) in Cambridge.

See also 

 List of New Testament uncials
 Biblical manuscript
 Textual criticism

References

Further reading 

 Peter M. Head, "Five New Testament Manuscripts: Recently Discovered Fragments in a Private Collection in Cambridge", JTS, NS, 2008, pp. 536–538.

External links 
 Images from Uncial 0314 at the CSNTM
 "Continuation of the Manuscript List", Institute for New Testament Textual Research, University of Münster. Retrieved April 9, 2008

Greek New Testament uncials
6th-century biblical manuscripts
Manuscripts in Cambridge